Jochen Novodomsky (born 4 April 1968) is a German former footballer who played as a defender. He is best known for playing for Stuttgarter Kickers between 1990 and 1997.
 
Novodomsky played youth football for VfL Herrenberg before joining Stuttgarter Kickers. He made over 100 appearances across a seven-year spell for the club. After leaving the Kickers in 1997, Novodomsky went on to play for Reutlingen 05 and VfL Sindelfingen.

Career statistics

References

External links
 
 
 

1968 births
Living people
People from Herrenberg
Sportspeople from Stuttgart (region)
Footballers from Baden-Württemberg
German footballers
Association football defenders
Stuttgarter Kickers players
SSV Reutlingen 05 players
VfL Sindelfingen athletes
Bundesliga players
2. Bundesliga players
Regionalliga players